Hieracium sodiroanum is a species of flowering plant in the family Asteraceae that is endemic to Ecuador. Its natural habitats are subtropical or tropical moist montane forests and subtropical or tropical high-altitude shrubland. It is threatened by habitat loss.

References

sodiroanum
Endemic flora of Ecuador
Near threatened plants
Taxonomy articles created by Polbot
Plants described in 1922